Kirchler is a surname. Notable people with the surname include: 

Elisabeth Kirchler (born 1963), Austrian skier
Erich Kirchler (born 1954), Italian-Austrian psychologist
Hannes Kirchler (born 1978), Italian discus thrower
Roland Kirchler (born 1970), Austrian football player

See also
Kirchner